Esil District is a district of Akmola region in northern Kazakhstan. The administrative center of the district is the town of Esil. 

References

Districts of Kazakhstan
Akmola Region